Mengxia may refer to:

Wanhua District, a district in Taipei, Taiwan, originally called Mengxia (alternatively spelled Monga, Mengjia, Mongka, etc.)
Monga (film), a period film set and filmed in Wanhua District

Item named after Mengxia
Bangka Park, a park in Wanhua District

See also
Monga (disambiguation)
Mengjia (disambiguation)